Leading Women is an American consulting firm, designed to counteract gender disparity in corporate business, founded by Susan Colantuono in 2003. Its primary aim is to reduce the gender gap in business leaders, and consulting with organisations to help them do this.

The organisation researched the careers of 2,000 women and found that when selecting candidates for career advancement, organisations prioritise business and strategic acumen by a factor of 2 to 1. This contradicts traditional career advice given to women, which stresses the importance of interpersonal skills instead of knowing the business well. This was publicised in a TED conference in 2014. Colantuono has expressed concerns about bias in existing human resources and promotion systems, as well as a general perception that women are believed to lack business strategy and financial acumen.

In October 2019, the organisation expanded to include conference services and provide their services to everyone instead of just select high-profile organisations. At the same time, Colantuno announced she would step down from the organisation at the end of the year. She was replaced as CEO by Kelly Lockwood Primus. Primus has said diversity and inclusion help a company, as it fosters collaboration and innovation, helping a business' bottom line.

References

External links
 Leading Women Website
 Research on The Missing 33%TM in Women's Advancement
 Research on Minimizing the Impact of Gender Dynamics in Business

American consultants
Gender pay gap